The Mitsubishi Electric Halle (formerly Philips Halle) is an indoor arena located in Düsseldorf, Germany. It opened in 1971 and has a capacity of 7,500 people. It was originally named after Dutch electronics conglomerate Philips. It was renamed the Mitsubishi Electric Halle in April 2011.

It was home of the RheinEnergie Köln, for Euroleague games, for the 2006/2007 season. On 7 May 2001, Irish vocal pop band Westlife held a concert for their Where Dreams Come True Tour supporting their album Coast to Coast. In their early days, U2 played there on the 10 October 1984 as part of The Unforgettable Fire Tour. On June 29 2007 french electronic duo Daft Punk performed their first time in Germany with the Alive 2006/2007 tour.

On 15 June 2019, British pop band Take That played a date as part of their European Greatest Hits Live tour.

The nearest Train Station to the arena is Düsseldorf-Oberbilk, which is served by S-Bahn lines S1, S6 and during peak hours S68, Stadtbahn lines U74, U77 and U79 as well as Tram line 705.

References

External links
Official website

Indoor arenas in Germany
Basketball venues in Germany
Buildings and structures in Düsseldorf
Mitsubishi Electric
Sports venues in North Rhine-Westphalia
Convention centres in Germany